Global Ports is the leading Russian operator of container terminals.

Global Ports' terminals are located in the Baltic and the Far East basins. The group operates five container terminals in Russia: Petrolesport, First Container Terminal, Ust-Luga Container Terminal, and Moby Dik on the Baltic sea, inland terminal Yanino Logistics Park near Saint Petersburg; and Vostochnaya Stevedoring Company in Vostochny Port on the Sea of Japan. It also operates two container terminals in Finland: Multi-link in Helsinki and Kotka.

History 
In 2007, Konstantin Nikolaev, Nikita Mishin, and Andrey Filatov acquired 100% of Severstaltrans shares, buying 50% from Alexei Mordashov and renaming the company N-Trans Group. The group now consists of Vostochnaya Stevedoring Company (75% ownership, 25% owned by DP World), Petrolesport, Moby Dick container terminal (75% ownership, 25% owned by Container Finance Group (Finland)), Yanino Logistics Park (75% ownership, 25% owned by Container Finance Group), and 50% ownership of the oil terminal Vopak E.O.S (the other 50% owned by Royal Vopak).

Global Ports was founded in 2008, to operate N-Trans Group's assets.

In 2011, Global Ports held an IPO on the London Stock Exchange. The company's worth was estimated to be $2.35 billion. The public float was 25%. The total flotation cost was $534 million. Of the amount raised, $100 million were received by Global Ports and the rest went to N-Trans.

In November 2012, APM Terminals, part of Maersk, bought half of N-Trans's Global Ports shares, amounting to 37.5% ownership. The transaction value was not disclosed, although the shares' market value at the time of transaction was around $860 million. Prior to the deal, Global Ports bought 25% of Vostochnaya Stevedoring Company from the Arabic port operator DP World for $230 million.

In 2013, Global Ports bought National Container Company. The deal included 100% ownership of First Container Terminal, 80% of Ust-Luga Container Terminal, and 100% of Logistika Terminal. Global Ports paid $291 million and 18% of its shares, which resulted in the main Global Ports stockholders' (TIHL and APM Terminals) ownership dropping from 37.5% to 30.75%, the public float declining from 25% to 20.5%. Previous NCC shareholders Andrey Kobzar and First Quantum Management received 9% of Global Ports shares.

In 2017, Global Ports sold 100% of CJSC Logistika Terminal (a dry port south of Saint Petersburg) to TransContainer for 1.9 billion roubles.

In 2018, the Delo Group bought out N-Trans' ownership in Global Ports (30.75%). The transaction amount was not disclosed.

In 2019, Global Ports sold VEOS terminal in Estonia.

Current owners and management 
The main shareholders of Global Ports are the Russian transportation and logistics holding company Delo Group (30.75%), and APM Terminals international holding, which is a part of the Maersk shipping company (30.75%). 20.5% of the shares are being exchanged in the form of GDRs at the London Stock Exchange.

Albert Likholet became director general of Global Ports on 16 July 2020. He is also the head of Petrolesport and First Container Terminal. He replaced a former head of the Delo Group, Vladimir Bychkov, who headed Global Ports from 2018 until 2020. The Global Ports Investments PLC board of directors has 11 members. The chairman is Soren Jacobsen, who represents APM Terminals.

Assets 
The total capacity of Global Ports' marine container terminals is 4.2 million TEUs. It has 2,800 employees.

First Container Terminal 

Located in Big port Saint Petersburg, JSC First Container Terminal is the largest and oldest container terminal in Russia. It was established in 1973 and was the first specialized container terminal in the city. FCT is connected by regular feeder traffic with main European ports, such as the Port of Rotterdam, the Port of Hamburg, the Ports of Bremen and the Port of Antwerp. It is connected with the central region of Russia via railways and highways and to main ports of the west Baltic Sea via ferry lines.

Petrolesport 

JSC Petrolesport is a stevedoring company, operating in the northwest of Russia. The company is located in the Saint Petersburg offshore zone on the Gutuevsky, Volny, Gladky, and Grebenka islands. It is connected with the central part of Russia via railways and highways, and to main ports in the west Baltic Sea via ferry lines. The terminal's history dates back to the Timber Port which was created at the end of the 19th century.

The company handles various kinds of cargo—including timber, ferrous and non-ferrous metals, scrap metal, metal goods, and project cargoes, including heavy and outsize cargoes—but primarily container and ferry cargoes. The specialised container terminal is the second largest by capacity in Russia and the CIS, and has the greatest space for refrigerated containers in the region.

Petrolesport Ferry Terminal is one of the largest complexes for handling roll-on/roll-off (ro-ro) cargoes in Russia. In 2019, a new temperature-controlled trans-shipment cross dock complex started operations at Petrolesport, and became the biggest repacking hub in Big port Saint Petersburg.

Vostochnaya Stevedoring Company 

Vostochnaya Stevedoring Company (VSC) is the largest container terminal in the Russian Far East. It is located in the Vrangel district, close to the city of Nakhodka, of the deep-water warm-water port of Vostochny Port on the Pacific Ocean. The container terminal, which became the basis for the company, was established in 1976 and was the second specialised container terminal in the USSR. VSC has direct access to the Nakhodka-Vostochnaya railway station, the eastern terminus of the Trans-Siberian Railway.

VSC handles ro-ro vessels and provides services such as the storing of refrigerated containers and, most importantly, forming and dispatching block trains. A specialised complex for handling coal operated in 2011-2021. VSC is a part of AE19 and AE19 Eastbound — a multi-modal container service between Asia and North European countries via ports of Vostochny and Saint Petersburg. The total throughput capacity of the terminal is 700,000 TEU a year.

Ust-Luga Container Terminal 

JSC Ust-Luga Container Terminal (ULCT) is located in deep-sea port of Ust-Luga on Luga Bay of the Gulf of Finland. Global Ports' partner in ULCT is the German container operator , which owns 20%.

The terminal handled its first vessel on 29 December 2011. An investment programme will expand the throughput capacity to 2.85 million TEU.

From December 2018, the terminal started handling coal. Railway infrastructure and terminal capacity allows it to handle up to 1 million tonnes of coal a year.

Moby Dik 

Moby Dik LLC is a marine cargo terminal located in Kronstadt on the Kotlin Island at the entrance to Big port Saint Petersburg. Construction began in 2000, and in 2002 Moby Dik handled its first vessel. The terminal handles container, bulk, general, large, and ro-ro cargoes. Global Ports owns 75% of the terminal, and the other 25% is owned by CMA Terminals, which is part of CMA CGM. The terminal has direct access to the Saint Petersburg Ring Road, is located near the Nissan and Hyundai factories, and is near the border checkpoint of Litke Base, Kotlin Island, and the Baltic customs station Kronshtadtskiy.

Yanino Logistics Park 
Yanino Logistics Park is a multi-functional transportation and logistics complex, a dry port, initially created for expanding warehouse capacity for the Saint Petersburg and Kronstadt terminals. It is located 1.5 kilometers from the Saint Petersburg Ring Road and is connected with Petrolesport by rail. Built in 2010, it started operating at full capacity from May 2011. Global Ports owns 75% of Yanino, with the other 25% owned by CMA Terminals.

ROLIS 
Russian Logistics Information Systems (ROLIS) is a specialised developer of IT systems for Global Ports Group companies and other transport companies in the transport industry. The company was created in 2004 on the basis of information service of the First Container Terminal. With ROLIS participation, FCT was the first Russian stevedoring company to introduce electronic digital signature (in 2009) and the first to implement electronic data exchange with the Russian Federal Customs Service (in 2013), became the first Russian terminal in Russia to provide full electronic document processing at all stages of cargo handling (in 2015). In 2020, FCT became the first Russian terminal to switch to completely paperless export clearance.

Multi-Link Terminals 
Multi-Link Terminals Ltd Oy (MLT) operates two terminals in Finland. Multi-Link Terminals was founded in 2004 as a stevedore subsidiary of Container Ships shipping line. The terminal in West Harbour in Helsinki started operating first; and in 2005, the terminal in Kotka was launched. 75% of Multi-Link Terminals is owned by Global Ports, with the other 25% owned by CMA Terminals.

In 2008, all operations from the West Harbour were transferred to the new Vuosaari Harbour as part of the programme for freeing the historical city from cargo terminals. MLT-Helsinki, among other transferred terminals, started operating in the new port. The terminals specialize in Finnish export and import shipments, as well as Russian transit.

Financials 
Global Ports' total revenue for 2021 was $502.8 million and adjusted EBITDA was $246.2 million. In 2021, the consolidated marine container throughput of the group was 1.576 million TEU.

 Financial data

As of the end of 2018, Global Ports is the leading container operator in Russia, with a 51% share in the Baltic and 30% in the Far East basins. In the first quarter of 2020, the group's total share of the Russian container market was 31.2%.

 Operational performance

References

External links 
 

Port operating companies
Transport companies of Russia
Companies listed on the London Stock Exchange